Siberut is the largest and northernmost of the Mentawai Islands, located 150 kilometres west of Sumatra in the Indian Ocean. It covers an area of 3,838.25 km2 including smaller offshore islands, and had a population of 35,091 at the 2010 Census and 40,220 at the 2020 Census. A part of Indonesia, the island is the most important home for the Mentawai people. The western half of the island was set aside as the Siberut National Park in 1993. Much of the island is covered with rainforest, but is subject to commercial logging.

Smaller islands adjacent to Siberut include Karamajet and Masokut which lie in the Bungalaut Strait to the south of the island.

The island is known for its range of primates, including the Kloss gibbon (Hylobates klossii), pig-tailed langur (Simias concolor), Siberut langur (Presbytis siberu) and Mentawai macaque (Macaca pagensis).

Siberut was affected by the 2004 Indian Ocean earthquake tsunami, but without any known loss of human life.  One report stated that the island may have been raised up to two metres by the earthquake.

Geography
The west coast features mainly Barringtonia forests and is difficult to get to because of rough seas and steep cliffs. There are also areas of dipterocarp primary forest.

Biodiversity
Siberut has been isolated from the mainland Sunda shelf since the Middle Pleistocene. This isolation has led to a much biodiversity, with about 900 species of vascular plants and 31 mammal species. Sixty-five percent of mammals and fifteen percent of other animals are endemic at some taxonomic level, making Siberut unique. Of the 134 bird species found on Siberut, 19 are endemic at some taxonomic level.
There are four endemic primates: the bokkoi (Macaca pagensis), lutung Mentawai/joja (Presbytis potenziani siberu), bilou (Hylobates klossii) and simakobu (Simias concolor siberu).

Environment
Siberut was recognized as a biosphere reserve in 1981.

About 70% of the remaining forest outside the reserve is subject to logging concessions, some operative and others pending.

In 2001, UNESCO brought in a new phase of its Siberut Programme, with the intention of protecting the ecosystem through local development. This phase involves creating a partnership of local communities, conservation groups and local government, an approach which appears to be popular locally. However, poor governance and corruption has led to substantial illegal logging.

Culture
Some anthropologists believe that several thousand years ago, the Bataks of North Sumatra may have been the first to settle here. However, there are now substantial differences in culture and language among the inhabitants. The Swiss anthropologist, Reimar Schefold spent years among the Siberut groups, the Sakuddei.

On the western parts of the island, there is a tradition of communal long houses known as uma.

References

External links

Mentawai Islands Regency
Biosphere reserves of Indonesia
Islands of the Indian Ocean
Populated places in Indonesia